The 2021 Tennessee Volunteers baseball team represented the University of Tennessee during the 2021 NCAA Division I baseball season. Tennessee competed in the Eastern Division of the Southeastern Conference (SEC). The Volunteers play their home games at Lindsey Nelson Stadium. Coach Tony Vitello lead the Volunteers in his 4th season with the program.

Tennessee reached the College World Series for the first time since 2005, but were eliminated in two games. The Volunteers finished the season with a 50–18 record.

Previous season

The 2020 Tennessee Volunteers baseball team notched a 15–2 (0–0) regular season record. The season prematurely ended on March 12, 2020, due to concerns over the COVID-19 pandemic.

Personnel

Roster

Coaching Staff

Game log

Knoxville Regional

College World Series

Rankings

Record vs. conference opponents

2021 MLB draft

Notes

References

External links 
 Tennessee Baseball

Tennessee Volunteers
Tennessee Volunteers baseball seasons
Tennessee Volunteers baseball
Tennessee
College World Series seasons